Rogachevka is a rural locality (a selo) in Novoivanovsky Selsoviet of Svobodnensky District, Amur Oblast, Russia. The population was 332 as of 2018. There are 5 streets.

Geography 
Rogachevka is located 33 km southwest of Svobodny (the district's administrative centre) by road. Serebryanka is the nearest rural locality.

References 

Rural localities in Svobodnensky District